Cold Spring Harbor (1986) was the final novel by American writer Richard Yates.

Plot summary 
At seventeen,  Evan Shepard gets Mary Donovan pregnant accidentally, so they marry, live together, the baby, Kathleen, is born, but they're too young for matrimony and family life, it isn't working out, so the couple break up. Mary passes the infant to her parents to look after so she can go to college. Evan moves back home, staying in his tool-apprentice factory job. 
Some years later, when Evan is nearly twenty-four, his father Charles gets Evan to drive him to New York to attend an optometrist's appointment for his bad eyesight. The car breaks down on the way. They seek use of a telephone at a random house to call a car repair garage. This connects them to the home-owner, Gloria Drake, an overbearing divorcee, and her two children: daughter Rachel, 17, and a son, Phil, 15.  
Evan, immediately attracted to Rachel, resolves to return soon, to see her again. He does so the following week. They strike up a relationship, and soon they want to marry. Charles (who would have preferred a deferral but doesn't get his way) suggests that the wedding be held in his neck of the woods - Cold Spring Harbor - with the reception afterwards to be at his home residence. 
With her daughter flown the nest, and her son away at boarding school, Gloria goes home alone to an empty home. She decides to try to put herself where her daughter is, and so, locates a large house available near Cold Spring Harbor available to rent, then offers to share use of the property with Rachel and Evan. By now Rachel is pregnant. All four - Evan, Rachel, Gloria, Phil (who arrives home from boarding school for the summer) are thus under one roof. But there is tension; the house is damp, ramshackle, lacking internal soundproofing: the sharing arrangement isn't working well.  
To make matters worse, Evan falls out with Phil, now sixteen, while giving him his first driving lesson. This sets the tone for bad relations between the two. 
An encounter with a schoolmate from Phil's boarding school who lives in the area, Gerald "Flash" Ferris, involves Gloria, Rachel and Phil with Flash's rich grandmother. Talmage, and leads to Phil having someone his own age to hang out with during the long vacation. But then Phil gets a summer job as a parking attendant at a restaurant, so Phil doesn't go out for bike rides with Flash any more.  
Evan mocks Phil for not going out to get laid at 16.  
Evan goes on a Saturday visit to see the daughter by his first marriage, Kathleen, who by now is aged seven. Learning from her that Mary, her mother (Evan's ex-wife) is working at a fast-food outlet, Evan diverts there on his way home, Mary and Evan go for a drink and a chat when her evening's work finishes, and the pair end up having sex in her apartment. Mary concedes to Evan that while he shouldn't make a habit of it, this doesn't need to be just a one-off event.  
Soon Evan goes to have intercourse with Mary a second time.  
Rachel escapes a boring afternoon meeting with Charles and Grace (Evan's parents), to which Talmage and Flash turn up uninvited, by leaving the rented house and wandering along the main road. Evan, on finding her there as he drives home from work, takes Rachel to a restaurant. Rachel condemns her mother as "crazy" and says Evan and herself should leave the shared house immediately since living with Rachel's overbearing mother is a bad arrangement. Evan says a friend from work who is joining the army has offered them an apartment to rent, which they happen to have used once previously. While Evan and Rachel are at the restaurant Rachel's labour starts. She goes to hospital and gives birth to a son two weeks prematurely. The three parents (grandparents of the new baby) - Charles, Gloria, and Gloria's ex-husband Curtis - show up to gather at the maternity bedside, but Gloria creates a rude scene and has to be taken away and put in a cab home. Curtis and Charles go for a drink and have lunch together.  
Phil comes to see his new nephew in hospital.  
Gloria, sulking, keeps to her bedroom at home for two weeks.  
Flash calls on Phil in the parking lot job in the family limo, bringing a younger boy along.  
Evan is still carrying on his affair with his ex-wife.  
Gloria eventually comes out of her bedroom for a reconciliation.  
Evan has the keys to the substitute accommodation but Charles (his father) advises Evan against Rachel and himself leaving the shared house as they would be letting Gloria down by doing this, and she is mentally unstable. 
Phil spies, through a liftable curtain, on Rachel and Evan having sex, but gets caught. Ashamed, he heads off at speed to his replacement boarding school for the new term, glad to see the back of "this rotten town". He meets Curtis, his father, on the way, who buys him two new suits to take back to school with him to wear.  
Evan goes downstairs to tell his mother-in-law, Gloria, that he and Rachel are ending the house-sharing arrangement. But when Evan comes back upstairs he has an argument with Rachel, he hits her in the face, and leaves. He goes to a bar alone to console himself. Drinking and mulling over his options, Evan decides he would prefer to be back with his ex-wife Mary, and their daughter Kathleen, in preference to being with current wife Rachel and the new son. The book ends with Rachel changing the baby's nappy, waiting alone for Evan to come home to her.

External links
 http://topics.nytimes.com/topics/reference/timestopics/people/y/richard_yates/index.html
 https://web.archive.org/web/20070509221812/http://bostonreview.net/BR24.5/onan.html

Novels by Richard Yates
1986 American novels
Novels set in Long Island